The Friis transmission formula is used in telecommunications engineering, equating the power at the terminals of a receive antenna as the product of power density of the incident wave and the effective aperture of the receiving antenna under idealized conditions given another antenna some distance away transmitting a known amount of power. The formula was presented first by Danish-American radio engineer Harald T. Friis in 1946. The formula is sometimes referenced as the Friis transmission equation.

Friis' original formula
Friis' original idea behind his transmission formula was to dispense with the usage of directivity or gain when describing antenna performance. In their place is the descriptor of antenna capture area as one of two important parts of the transmission formula that characterizes the behavior of a free-space radio circuit.

This leads to his published form of his transmission formula:

where:
 is the power fed into the transmitting antenna input terminals;
 is the power available at receiving antenna output terminals;
 is the effective aperture area of the receiving antenna;
 is the effective aperture area of the transmitting antenna;
 is the distance between antennas;
 is the wavelength of the radio frequency;
Distance  large enough to ensure a plane wave front at the receive antenna sufficiently approximated by  where  is the largest linear dimension of either of the antennas.

Friis stated the advantage of this formula over other formulations is the lack of numerical coefficients to remember, but does require the expression of transmitting antenna performance in terms of power flow per unit area instead of field strength and the expression of receiving antenna performance by its effective area rather than by its power gain or radiation resistance.

Contemporary formula
Few follow Friis' advice on using antenna effective area to characterize antenna performance over the contemporary use of directivity and gain metrics. Replacing the effective antenna areas with their gain counterparts yields

To use the equation as written, the antenna gains are unitless values, and the units for wavelength and distance must be the same.

To calculate using decibels, the equation becomes:

where:
  is the power delivered to the terminals of an isotropic transmit antenna, expressed in dB.
  is the gain of the transmitting antenna in the direction of the receiving antenna, in dB.
  is the gain of the receiving antenna in the direction of the transmitting antenna, in dB.
The simple form applies under the following conditions:
 , so that each antenna is in the far field of the other.
 The antennas are correctly aligned and have the same polarization.
 The antennas are in unobstructed free space, with no multipath propagation.
 The bandwidth is narrow enough that a single value for the wavelength can be used to represent the whole transmission.
 Directivities are both for isotropic radiators (dBi).
 Powers are both presented in the same units: either both dBm or both dBW.

The ideal conditions are almost never achieved in ordinary terrestrial communications, due to obstructions, reflections from buildings, and most importantly reflections from the ground. One situation where the equation is reasonably accurate is in satellite communications when there is negligible atmospheric absorption; another situation is in anechoic chambers specifically designed to minimize reflections.

Derivation  

There are several methods to derive the Friis transmission equation. In addition to the usual derivation from antenna theory, the basic equation also can be derived from principles of radiometry and scalar diffraction in a manner that emphasizes physical understanding. Another derivation is to take the far-field limit of the near-field transmission integral.

See also
Link budget
Radio propagation model

References

Further reading
 Harald T. Friis, "A Note on a Simple Transmission Formula," Proceedings of the I.R.E. and Waves and Electrons, May, 1946, pp 254–256.
 John D. Kraus, "Antennas," 2nd Ed., McGraw-Hill, 1988.
 Kraus and Fleisch, "Electromagnetics," 5th Ed., McGraw-Hill, 1999.
 D.M. Pozar, "Microwave Engineering." 2nd Ed., Wiley, 1998.

External links
Derivation of Friis Transmission Formula
Friis Transmission Equation Calculator
Another Friis Transmission Equation Calculator
Seminar Notes by Laasonen

Antennas
Radio frequency propagation model